Aviaexpress was an airline based in Hungary.

Code data 
IATA Code: RX
ICAO Code: AEH  (no longer allocated)
Callsign: Avex (no longer allocated)

Fleet 
As of August 2006 the Aviaexpress fleet included:

2 Let L-410 UVP

References

External links

Defunct airlines of Hungary
Airlines established in 1988
Airlines disestablished in 2003
Hungarian companies established in 1988
2003 disestablishments in Hungary